PANSA is the Polish Air Navigation Services Agency.

Pansa may also refer to:

People

Given name
 Pansa Hemviboon (born 1990), Thai footballer
 Pansa Meesatham (born 1974), Thai footballer

Surname
 Alessandro Pansa (1962–2017), Italian business executive
 Jean-Marc Pansa (born 1997), French basketball player
 María Isabel Pansa (born 1961), Argentine Army general

Cognomen
 Gaius Vibius Pansa Caetronianus (fl. 51–43 BC), Roman consul
 Marcus Hirrius Fronto Neratius Pansa (fl. 70–80), Roman senator

Organisms
 Aphantophryne pansa, a frog of family Microhylidae
 Carex pansa, a sedge of family Cyperaceae
 Ismene pansa, a butterfly of family Hesperiidae
 Myosotis petiolata var. pansa, a forget-me-not of family Boraginaceae
 Pansa aurociliata, a moth of family Sesiidae
 Plicopurpura pansa, a sea snail of family Muricidae

Other uses
 Pansá Blanca, a Spanish grape variety
 PanSa East F.C., association football club based in Pago Pago, American Samoa

See also
Panza (disambiguation)